National Highway 233A is a National Highway in India that links Rajesultanpur nasirpur Chhitauna,gangasagar,Ambedkar Nagar in Uttar Pradesh to Ayodhya in Uttar Pradesh.up

Start
National Highway 233A starts  in Ayodhya City Outed in Near NH 27(Ayodhya to Gorkhapur).
Formally We are know Faizabad City(Ayodhya City) In Devakali Chowk

Route
 Ayodhya City(Ring Road To Saketpuri)
 Devkali
 Darshan Nagar
 Maya Bazzar
 Iltifatganj Bazar 
 Tanda(NH 28 Bypass)
 Hanswar
 Aropur
 Ramnagar, Alapur
 Jahangirganj(Mampur to Nahar road)Road)
 Deoria 
 POORANPUR
Nasirpur Chhitauna 
Ganganagar 
 Tenduvaikalan 
 Padumpur 
 Rajesultanpur(Near Gopalbaag Chowk in  NH233B )

See also
 List of National Highways in India (by Highway Number)
 National Highways Development Project

References 

233A
Rajesultanpur
National highways in India (old numbering)

Transport in Allahabad district
Transport in Ayodhya